Panchayati Times is a digital news portal carrying rural India's voice, published from New Delhi, India. It is also available on mobile App Store for Android. Nandan Jha is the founder and chairman of the portal. Panchayati Times, through its digital presence, has reached out to nearly a million users and is regularly followed by various political leaders, Government ministries, PSUs, Entrepreneurs, Academicians, Journalists, social activists etc. Panchayati Times has been endorsed and appreciated by various political leaders and eminent personalities including Swami Avdheshanand Giriji Maharaj, Anurag Thakur, Hemant Soren, Manish Sisodia, M. K. Stalin, and Pramod Sawant.

About Panchayati Times
Panchayati Times was founded in 2014 by Nandan Jha. It is an initiative of Interactive Forum on Indian Economy (IFIE) followed by honorable Prime Minister of India Sri Narendra Modi & various other Union Ministers. IFIE is a Government of India recognized 80G, 12A, 8A complaint non profitable company.

Panchayati Times was launched on 26 December 2018 at Vigyan Bhawan New Delhi by Vice President of India Sri Venkaiah Naidu, Justice K. G. Balakrishnan (Former Chief Justice of India), Subhash Ghai, Pahlaj Nihalani (film producer), Govinda (actor), N. Biren Singh (Chief Minister of Manipur), Ved Pratap Vaidik (journalist), and Justice Gyan Sudha Misra (Former Judge Supreme Court Of India).

Panchayati Times as a media partner of Interactive Forum on Indian Economy organized first edition of Champions of change awards in 2018 at Vigyan Bhawan, New Delhi, second edition in 2020 at Vigyan Bhawan, New Delhi and third edition in 2021 at Goa, India. It has also organized first edition of champions of change Maharashtra award at Taj Mahal Palace, Mumbai on 30 September' 2021.

References

External links
 Official website
 Panchayati Times on YouTube

News magazines published in India
Magazines established in 2014
2014 establishments in Delhi
Hindi-language magazines